RAR is a proprietary archive file format that supports data compression, error correction and file spanning. It was developed in 1993 by Russian software engineer Eugene Roshal and the software is licensed by win.rar GmbH. The name RAR stands for Roshal Archive.

File format 
The filename extensions used by RAR are .rar for the data volume set and .rev for the recovery volume set. Previous versions of RAR split large archives into several smaller files, creating a "multi-volume archive".  Numbers were used in the file extensions of the smaller files to keep them in the proper sequence.  The first file used the extension .rar, then .r00 for the second, and then .r01, .r02, etc.

RAR compression applications and libraries (including GUI based WinRAR application for Windows, console rar utility for different OSes and others) are proprietary software, to which Alexander L. Roshal, the elder brother of Eugene Roshal, owns the copyright. Version 3 of RAR is based on Lempel-Ziv (LZSS) and prediction by partial matching (PPM) compression, specifically the PPMd implementation of PPMII by Dmitry Shkarin.

The minimum size of a RAR file is 20 bytes. The maximum size of a RAR file is 9,223,372,036,854,775,807 (263−1) bytes, which is about 9,000 PB.

Versions
The RAR file format revision history:
 1.3 – the first public version, does not have the "Rar!" signature.
 1.5 – changes are not known.
 2.0 – released with WinRAR 2.0 and Rar for MS-DOS 2.0; features the following changes:
 Multimedia compression for true color bitmap images and uncompressed audio.
 Up to 1 MB compression dictionary.
 Introduces archives data recovery protection record.
 2.9 – released in WinRAR version 3.00.  Feature changes in this version include:
 File extensions is changed from {volume name}.rar, {volume name}.r00, {volume name}.r01, etc. to {volume name}.part001.rar, {volume name}.part002.rar, etc.
 Encryption of both file data and file headers.
 Improves compression algorithm using 4 MB dictionary size, Dmitry Shkarin's PPMII algorithm for file data.
 Optional creation of "recovery volumes" (.rev files) for error correction, which can be used to reconstruct missing files in a volume set.
 Support for archive files larger than 9 GB.
 Support for Unicode file names stored in UTF-16 little endian format.
 5.0 – supported by WinRAR 5.0 and later. Changes in this version:
 Maximum compression dictionary size increased to 1 GB (default for WinRAR 5.x is 32 MB and 4 MB for WinRAR 4.x).
 Maximum path length for files in RAR and ZIP archives is increased up to 2048 characters.
 Support for Unicode file names stored in UTF-8 format.
 Faster compression and decompression.
 Multicore decompression support.
 Greatly improves recovery.
 Optional AES encryption increased from 128-bit to 256-bit.
 Optional 256-bit BLAKE2 file hash instead of a default 32-bit CRC32 file checksum.
 Optional duplicate file detection.
 Optional NTFS hard and symbolic links.
 Optional Quick Open Record. Rar4 archives had to be parsed before opening as file names were spread throughout the archive, slowing operation particularly with slower devices such as optical drives, and reducing the integrity of damaged archives. Rar5 can optionally create a "quick open record", a special archive block at the end of the file that contains the names of files included, allowing archives to be opened faster.
 Removes specialized compression algorithms for Itanium executables, text, raw audio (WAV), and raw image (BMP) files; consequently some files of these types compress better in the older RAR (4) format with these options enabled than in RAR5.

Notes

Software

Operating system support
Software is available for Microsoft Windows (named WinRAR), Linux, FreeBSD, macOS, and Android; archive extraction is supported natively in ChromeOS. WinRAR supports the Windows graphical user interface (GUI); other versions named RAR run as console commands. Later versions are not compatible with some older operating systems previously supported:
 WinRAR v6.10 supports Windows Vista and later.
 WinRAR v6.02 is the last version that supports Windows XP.
 WinRAR v4.11 is the last version that supports Windows 2000.
 WinRAR v3.93 is the last version that supports Windows 95, 98, ME, and NT 4.0.
 WinRAR 2.06 is the last version to support Windows 3.1, Windows NT 3.1, Windows NT 3.5, Windows NT 3.51 and Win32s.
 RAR v3.93 is the last version that supports MS-DOS and OS/2 on 32-bit x86 CPUs such as 80386 and later. It supports long file names in a Windows DOS box (except Windows NT), and uses the RSX DPMI extender.
 RAR v2.50 is the last version that supports MS-DOS and OS/2 on 16-bit x86 CPUs such as Intel 8086, 8088, and 80286.

Creating RAR files
RAR files can be created only with commercial software WinRAR (Windows), RAR for Android, command-line RAR (Windows, MS-DOS, macOS, Linux, and FreeBSD), and other software that has written permission from Alexander Roshal or uses copyrighted code under license from Roshal. The software license agreements forbid reverse engineering.

Third-party software for extracting RAR files
Several programs can unpack the file format.
 RARLAB distributes the C++ source code and binaries for a command-line unrar program. The license permits its use to produce software capable of unpacking, but not creating, RAR archives, without having to pay a fee. It is not a free software license.
 7-Zip, a free and open-source program, starting from 7-Zip version 15.06 beta can unpack RAR5 archives, using the RARLAB unrar code.
 PeaZip is a free RAR unarchiver, licensed under the LGPL, it runs as a RAR extractor on Linux, macOS, and Windows, with a GUI. PeaZip supports both pre-RAR5 .rar files, and files in the new RAR5 format.
 The Unarchiver is a proprietary software unarchiver for RAR and other formats. It runs on macOS, and the command-line version, also runs on Windows and on Linux, and is free software licensed under the LGPL. It supports all versions of the RAR archive format, including RAR3 and RAR5.
 UNRARLIB (UniquE RAR File Library) was an obsolete free software unarchiving library called "unrarlib", licensed under the GPL. It could only decompress archives created by RAR versions prior to 2.9; archives created by RAR 2.9 and later use different formats not supported by this library. The original development-team ended work on this library in 2007.
 libarchive, a free and open source library for reading and writing a variety of archive formats, supports all RAR versions including RAR5. The code was written from scratch using RAR's "technote.txt" format description.

Other uses of rar
The filename extension rar is also used by the unrelated Resource Adapter Archive file format.

See also 
 .cbr
 List of archive formats
 Comparison of archive formats
 Comparison of file archivers
 Data corruption, Bit rot, Disc rot

References

External links 
 
 RARLAB FTP download website, current and old versions of WinRAR and RAR
 RAR 5.0 archive file format

Computer-related introductions in 1993
Archive formats
Russian inventions